Nicolás Fabián Rodríguez (born 12 May 1993) is an Argentine professional footballer who plays as a goalkeeper for Unión San Felipe.

Career
Rodríguez's career started with River Plate. He was an unused substitute on eleven occasions in the 2013–14 and 2014 seasons. In 2015, he departed on loan to join fellow Argentine Primera División team Temperley. Rodríguez returned to his parent club at the conclusion of 2015 without featuring for Temperley. He departed River Plate permanently in 2016, subsequently joining Primera B Nacional's Talleres. Talleres won promotion in his first season, but Rodríguez failed to be selected for a first-team game though he was on the bench twice. In July 2017, Rodríguez rejoined Temperley of the Primera División.

However, like in 2015, he didn't make an appearance in 2016–17. On 21 July 2017, Rodríguez joined Primera B Metropolitana side Fénix. He made his professional debut on 2 September against Tristán Suárez, playing the full duration of a 2–0 defeat. It was one of thirty-three appearances in his opening campaign with Fénix. June 2018 saw Rodríguez move up to Primera B Nacional by joining Santamarina.

Career statistics
.

Honours
River Plate
U-20 Copa Libertadores: 2012
Primera División: 2013–14 Torneo Final

Talleres
Primera B Nacional: 2016

References

External links

1993 births
Living people
People from Quilmes
Argentine footballers
Argentine expatriate footballers
Association football goalkeepers
Argentine Primera División players
Primera Nacional players
Primera B Metropolitana players
Primera B de Chile players
Club Atlético River Plate footballers
Club Atlético Temperley footballers
Talleres de Córdoba footballers
Club Atlético Fénix players
Club y Biblioteca Ramón Santamarina footballers
Unión San Felipe footballers
Argentine expatriate sportspeople in Chile
Expatriate footballers in Chile
Sportspeople from Buenos Aires Province